The Gifted Students' School ("GSS") is a co-educational institution for gifted students in Baghdad and another 6 cities, Iraq.  Every year, talented students from all over Iraq apply to the school, and IQ tests and science and math and creativity are administered.  Fewer than twenty students are accepted by each school each year.

History
The school was founded by the Iraqi government in 1998. In its first year the school accepted 10 male students as it started as a boys school. Later in 2004-2005 academic year, the school become co-educational as it accepted 10 female students in addition to 10 male students. The school's principal is Wisal Al-Doori, then Dr.Qasim Jaber Hassan became the new principal headmaster of the school, and he remained until 2015,When Dr.Wisal Al-Doori became the principal again.
the school teaches a special curriculum which is so different and harder than other schools in iraq.
which is why this schools students can choose any major at any college in iraq when they graduate with 75% or higher.
this school focuses especially on math and science which is why their curriculum is from international references that are higher than their peers in normal schools academic level.
the school has a summer school which is something that we don`t see in any other school in iraq. so their students are always involved in the academic life and they are so responsible and they depends on themselves in making a balanced ratio between their academic and personal life.

Eligibility Criteria
Until 2017, the Gifted Students’ School only accepted students who successfully completed their primary school (passed 6th grade). 

The requirements were as follows :

1. The student must score at least 97% in the final exams of the previous grade (5th grade).

2. The student should be in the legal age and did not fail any year before.

3. The student must score 100% in both maths and science in 6th grade.

4. The student must have at least 582/600 as a sum for the final exams in 6th grade.

Since 2017, the school opened new classes for 4th grade students to have the opportunity of joining the gifted students’ society.

As for the requirements, students need to get a full mark in all the subjects in 3rd grade to be eligible to apply for 4th grade in this school.

After the changes that took place in 2017,  the Gifted Students’ School no longer accepts students in 7th grade .

Regarding the application procedure:

The students are expected to pass 3 tests (Maths, Science and Creativity, As well as the IQ test) that take place in the Gifted Students’ School, in addition to an interview.

The school is known for being the most selective school in Iraq. 

The number of selected students annually does not exceed 15, those are then known as the Iraqi elite due to the rough steps they need to pass to be students of this school.

Campus
The school's original location was in Hayy Al-Jami'a, Baghdad, but it was relocated with Al-Mansor High School in Al-Mansor, Baghdad after being targeted by Al-Qaeda. Now the school has 6 other campuses in Iraq in An-Najaf, Al-Basrah, al-mosul and dhy qar and mesan also in al-anbar.

External links
The Gifted Students' School website

Educational institutions established in 1998
Schools in Baghdad
1998 establishments in Iraq